Tapa, TAPA, Tapas or Tapasya may refer to:

Media
Tapas (website), a webtoon site, formerly known as Tapastic
Tapas (film), a 2005 Spanish film
Tapasya (1976 film), an Indian Hindi-language film
Tapasya (1992 film), a Nepalese film
 Transactions of the American Philological Association, a journal

Places
Tapa, Estonia, a town
Tapa Airfield, an unused aircraft base in Estonia
Tapa Army Base, a military base in Estonia
V. C. Bird International Airport, by ICAO airport code

People
 Tapas (given name), a given name (including a list of people with the name)
Nupe people, an African people traditionally called the "Tapa" by the neighboring Yoruba people
Tapa Tchermoeff

Religion
 Tapas (Indian religions), a variety of austere spiritual meditation practices

Food
Tapa (Filipino cuisine)
Tapas, a Spanish snack

Organizations
TaPa (Tampereen Palloilijat), sports club from Tampere, Finland
 Taipei Adventist Preparatory Academy, a Christian high school in Taiwan
 Toronto Alliance for the Performing Arts
 Taiwan Action Party Alliance

Other uses
Tapa cloth, a traditional cloth from Polynesia
Tapa (game), similar to backgammon
 Trillium Advanced Portability Architecture, by Trillium Digital Systems